Filipe Barros Baptista de Toledo Ribeiro (born 29 May 1991) is a Brazilian lawyer and federal deputy for the state of Paraná.

Born in Londrina, he is affiliated with the Partido Social Liberal (PSL).

He is anticommunist and an ally of president Jair Bolsonaro.

External links

References 

Living people
1991 births
21st-century Brazilian politicians
Brazilian anti-communists
Social Liberal Party (Brazil) politicians
Members of the Chamber of Deputies (Brazil) from Paraná
People from Londrina